Dahmane El Harrachi  (real name Abderrahmane Amrani), (July 7, 1926 – August 31, 1980), was an Algerian Chaâbi singer of Chaoui origin. His song Ya Rayah made him the best exported and most translated Chaabi artist.

He moved to France in 1949 living in Lille, then Marseille, before eventually settling in Paris. It was in Paris where he made a name for himself, playing in the numerous Algerian cafés there.

Personal
His father, originally from the Chaoui village of Djellal in  the province of Khenchla, was the muezzin at the Djamaa el Kebir mosque in Algiers.

In 2009, his son Kamel El Harrachi issued a hommage CD to his father, titled "Ghana Fenou".

Influence
El Harrachi's music brought a modern touch to châabi, incorporating themes like immigrant struggle and longing for one's homeland into his songs, of which he wrote over 500. He has served as an inspiration to a generation of French raï artists, including Rachid Taha.

Death
He died on August 31, 1980 in a car accident on the highway in Algiers. He is buried at the El Kettar Cemetery.

References

External links
 Dahmane El Harrachi Website

1926 births
1980 deaths
Berber musicians
Chaoui people
People from El Biar
20th-century Algerian  male  singers
Road incident deaths in Algeria